Rand is a census-designated place (CDP) on the Kanawha River in Kanawha County, West Virginia, United States. As of the 2010 census, its population was 1,631. It is surrounded by the communities of Malden and DuPont City.

History
The unincorporated community within the historic Kanawha Salines area, was named after Plus Rand Levi, son of Mordecai Levi, patent holder of the Brick Road. Originally named "Plus" in 1907–1909 when large tract was purchased from Dickinson family. But due to a town already called plus, the community would become known as Levi until around the 1930s or 1940s where it would change again due to a town in Braxton county already named Levi, thus adopting the current name of Rand.

Notable people

Pro Football Hall of Fame wide receiver and ESPN analyst Randy Moss was born and raised in Rand, as well as Samuel Singleton Jr, a former minor league baseball player.

The ESPN Films production Rand University, which chronicled Moss’ journey from Rand to the National Football League, was largely filmed in Rand; the title refers to the area behind the town’s only hangout spot, a 7-Eleven store where many locals openly drink alcohol behind the store’s dumpsters.

References

External links 
https://web.archive.org/web/20071109011641/http://www.picturehistory.com/product/id/12999
https://web.archive.org/web/20080709025325/http://www.picturehistory.com/product/id/13000
https://web.archive.org/web/20110209112717/http://www.wvculture.org/history/placnamr.html

Census-designated places in Kanawha County, West Virginia
Census-designated places in West Virginia
Charleston, West Virginia metropolitan area
Populated places on the Kanawha River